Discovery is the act of detecting something new, or something previously unrecognized as meaningful. With reference to sciences and academic disciplines, discovery is the observation of new phenomena, new actions, or new events and providing new reasoning to explain the knowledge gathered through such observations with previously acquired knowledge from abstract thought and everyday experiences. A discovery may sometimes be based on earlier discoveries, collaborations, or ideas. Some discoveries represent a radical breakthrough in knowledge or technology.

New discoveries are acquired through various senses and are usually assimilated, merging with pre-existing knowledge and actions. Questioning is a major form of human thought and interpersonal communication, and plays a key role in discovery. Discoveries are often made due to questions. Some discoveries lead to the invention of objects, processes, or techniques. A discovery may sometimes be based on earlier discoveries, collaborations or ideas, and the process of discovery requires at least the awareness that an existing concept or method can be modified or transformed. However, some discoveries also represent a radical breakthrough in knowledge.

In science
Within scientific disciplines, discovery is the observation of new phenomena, actions, or events which helps explain knowledge gathered through previously acquired scientific evidence. In science, exploration is one of three purposes of research, the other two being description and explanation. Discovery is made by providing observational evidence and attempts to develop an initial, rough understanding of some phenomenon.

Discovery within the field of particle physics has an accepted definition for what constitutes a discovery:  a five-sigma level of certainty. Such a level defines statistically how unlikely it is that an experimental result is due to chance. The combination of a five-sigma level of certainty, and independent confirmation by other experiments, turns findings into accepted discoveries.

In education 

Within the field of education, discovery occurs through observations. These observations are common and come in various forms. Observations can occur as observations of students done by the teacher or observations of teachers done by other professionals. Student observations help teachers to identify where the students are developmentally and cognitively in the realm of their studies. Teacher observations are used by administrators to hold teachers accountable as they stay on target with their learning goals and treat the students with respect. From these different types of observations we discover the best possible education practices.

Observations of students completed by teachers 
Teachers observe students throughout the day in the classroom. These observations can be informal or formal. Teachers often use checklist, anecdotal notes, videos, interviews, written work or assessment, etc. In completing these observations, teachers can determine at which level the student is understanding the lessons. Using the information from observations, then allows teachers to make the necessary adaptations for the students in the classroom. These observations can also provide the foundation for strong relationships between teachers and students. When students have these relationships they feel safer and more comfortable in the classroom and are more willing and eager to learn. Through observations teachers discover the most developmentally appropriate practices to implement in their classrooms. These discoveries encourage and promote healthier learning styles and positive classroom atmospheres.

Observations of teachers completed by other professionals 
Within the education system, there are a set of standards put in place by government officials. Teachers are responsible for following these academic standards as a guideline for developmentally appropriate instruction. Within following those academic goals, teachers are also observed by administrators to ensure positive classroom environments. One of the tools that teachers could be graded with is called the nationally recognized CLASS tool. After using this tool "over 150 research studies prove that students in classrooms with high CLASS scores have better academic and social outcomes." The tool itself is known for encouraging positive classroom environments, regard for the students perspectives, behavior management skills, quality of feedback, and language modeling. The administrators rate each of the ten categories with the number scale of one to seven. One being the lowest score and seven being the highest score that the teacher may receive. It is through tools such as this one that administrators are able to hold their teachers to high standards and ensure the best educational practices for the students.

In exploration
Western culture has used the term "discovery" in their histories to lay claims over lands and people as "discovery" through discovery doctrines and subtly emphasize the importance of "exploration" in the history of the world, such as in the "Age of Discovery", the New World and any frontierist endeavour even into space as the "New Frontier".
In the course of this discovery has been used to describe the first incursions of peoples from one culture into the geographical and cultural environment of others. However, calling it discovery has been rejected by indigenous peoples from whose perspective, it was not a discovery but a first contact, and consider the term "discovery" to perpetuate colonialism, as for the discovery doctrine and frontierist concepts like terra nullius.

Discovery and the age of discovery has been alternatively, particularly regionally, referred to through using the term contact, Age of Contact or Contact Period.

See also

 Bold hypothesis
 :Category:Discoverers
 :Category:Lists of inventions or discoveries
 Creativity techniques
 Contact zone
 List of German inventions and discoveries
 List of multiple discoveries
 Logology (science)
 Multiple discovery
 Revelation
 Rights of nature
 Role of chance in scientific discoveries
 Scientific priority
 Serendipity
 Timeline of scientific discoveries

References

Specific references

General references
 
 
  (preprint)

External links
 A Science Odyssey: People and discoveries from PBS.
 TED-Education video - How simple ideas lead to scientific discoveries.
 A Guide to Inventions and Discoveries: From Adrenaline to the Zipper from Infoplease.

Learning
Observation
Cognition